A serial killer is typically a person who kills three or more people, with the murders taking place over more than a month and including a significant period of time between them. The Federal Bureau of Investigation (FBI) defines serial murder as "a series of two or more murders, committed as separate events, usually, but not always, by one offender acting alone".

Identified serial killers

Unidentified serial killers
This is a list of unidentified serial killers who committed crimes within the United States.

See also
 List of rampage killers in the United States
 List of mass shootings in the United States

International:
 Lists of serial killers

References

Bibliography

 
 
 
 

 
serial united states
Ser